"Don't Get Me Wrong" is a song released by British-American alternative rock group The Pretenders. It was the first single taken from the group's 1986 album, Get Close. It can also be found on the band's The Singles album, released in 1987. Chrissie Hynde said she was inspired to write the song for her friend John McEnroe.

Background
The song features a jangly guitar sound and an emphasis on melody. Hynde's lyrics contain literary references in addition to the more relationship-based subject matter typical for rock and pop music.

Reception
Billboard said that although Hynde is the only original Pretender remaining, this song represents "a pretty upbeat, strutting, confident Pretenders."  Cash Box praised Hynde's "sultry vocal" and "powerful songwriting." Classic rock review describes "Don't Get Me Wrong" as a "jaunty rock track".  Ultimate Classic Rock critic Matt Wardlaw rated it the Pretenders 8th greatest song, saying that it "[hammers] home the point rather succinctly that when it comes to love from the female point of view, it's best to expect the unexpected."

Music video
The music video for the song is a tribute to the British 1960s TV spy series The Avengers, with Chrissie Hynde playing Emma Peel searching for John Steed, while being diverted by body doubles and rival agents. She drives a 1983 Reliant Scimitar SS1. Steed actor Patrick Macnee appears in the original series' footage, with Hynde electronically inserted. Two edits to the video were made, the second edit adds alternate shots (including a scene of one of the body doubles being revealed to be a woman) and inserts footage of the band performing in a studio.

Personnel
Chrissie Hynde – lead vocals, rhythm guitar
Robbie McIntosh – guitars
T. M. Stevens – bass guitar

Additional Personnel
Chucho Merchán – bass guitar
Steve Jordan – drums, percussion
Paul "Wix" Wickens – synthesizer, piano

Charts
In the US, "Don't Get Me Wrong" became the group's second Top 10 hit on the Billboard Hot 100 chart, peaking at No. 10. Their first Top 10 pop hit, "Back on the Chain Gang", had reached No. 5 in 1983. "Don't Get Me Wrong" also spent three weeks atop the Billboard Album Rock Tracks chart in November 1986. It also reached No. 5 on the Radio & Records CHR/Pop Airplay Chart on December 12, 1986 staying on that position for a week and remaining on the chart for eleven weeks.
In the UK, the song also peaked at #10 in the UK Singles Chart. It was most successful in Australia, where it reached No. 8.

Weekly charts

Year-end charts

Certifications

Covers
 British pop singer Lily Allen covered the song for BBC Radio 1's 40th-anniversary celebrations in 2007 and was released on the subsequent compilation album. 
 Leigh Nash released a version in 2018.
 Hale Appleman covered the song in the musical episode "All That Hard, Glossy Armor" (Season 4, Episode 10) of The Magicians.

Feature
The song was also featured in the 1997 movie Romy and Michele's High School Reunion, but this and a few other songs were omitted from the movie's soundtrack album due to copyright issues.

References

1986 songs
1986 singles
The Pretenders songs
Songs written by Chrissie Hynde
Sire Records singles
Song recordings produced by Jimmy Iovine
Song recordings produced by Bob Clearmountain
Lily Allen songs